Korbel, California may refer to:
Korbel, Humboldt County, California
Korbel, Sonoma County, California